Armenosoma is a genus of beetles in the family Buprestidae, containing the following species:

 Armenosoma antiquum Thery, 1926
 Armenosoma atrum Waterhouse, 1887
 Armenosoma costiferum Obenberger, 1926
 Armenosoma jakobsoni Obenberger, 1926
 Armenosoma strandi Obenberger, 1936

References

Buprestidae genera